Ivan Marinov (Bulgarian: Иван Маринов) (17 October 1928 – 26 February 2003) was a Bulgarian composer. He was born in Sofia, Bulgaria.

References

1928 births
2003 deaths
Bulgarian composers
Musicians from Sofia